José Luis García (born 18 April 1985) is an Argentinian footballer who plays as a midfielder for Almirante Brown.

External links
 
 José Luis García – Argentine Primera statistics at Fútbol XXI 
 
 
 

1985 births
Living people
People from La Matanza Partido
Argentine footballers
Argentine expatriate footballers
San Lorenzo de Almagro footballers
Olimpo footballers
Club Almirante Brown footballers
Rosario Central footballers
Liga I players
FC Politehnica Timișoara players
FC Gloria Buzău players
Atlético Morelia players
Sportivo Luqueño players
Universidad de Chile footballers
Expatriate footballers in Chile
Argentine expatriate sportspeople in Chile
Expatriate footballers in Mexico
Argentine expatriate sportspeople in Mexico
Expatriate footballers in Paraguay
Argentine expatriate sportspeople in Paraguay
Expatriate footballers in Costa Rica
Argentine expatriate sportspeople in Costa Rica
Expatriate footballers in Romania
Argentine expatriate sportspeople in Romania
Association football midfielders
Sportspeople from Buenos Aires Province